Guillaume Lemans is a French screenwriter and film producer. He received a Canadian Screen Award nomination for Best Original Screenplay at the 7th Canadian Screen Awards in 2019 for Just a Breath Away (Dans la brume).

Filmography
Anything for Her (Pour elle) - 2008
Beauties at War (La guerre des Miss) - 2008
Caged (Captifs) - 2010
Point Blank (À bout portant) - 2010
Final Balance (Légitime Défense) - 2011
Le Marquis (2011)
Mea Culpa - 2014
A Perfect Man (Un homme idéal) - 2015
Burn Out - 2017
Just a Breath Away (Dans la brume) - 2018
The Night Eats the World (La nuit a dévoré le monde) - 2019

References

External links

21st-century French male writers
French male screenwriters
French film producers
Living people
Year of birth missing (living people)
21st-century French screenwriters